Abducted: The Mary Stauffer Story is a 2019 TV film that aired on Lifetime as part of its "Ripped from the Headlines" feature film. The film stars Alyson Hannigan, Howie Lai, Daphne Hoskins, Daniel Nemes, and Miles Phoenix Foley. It is based on the true story of the kidnapping of Mary and Elizabeth Stauffer at the hands of Ming Sen Shiue.

Plot

In 1980, the Stauffer family is planning a mission trip. When leaving a salon, Mary Stauffer and her daughter, Beth, are abducted at gunpoint by Mary's former student Ming Sen Shiue. During the kidnapping, a boy named Jason sees the abduction and is forced into the trunk of Mary's car by Ming along with Mary and Beth. Jason is later removed from the trunk and it is unknown what happens to him, though it is later revealed that Ming killed him and left his remains in the woods. Ming would then take Mary and Beth and kept them locked in his house where he threatened to kill the rest of the family should they try to escape or get help. Ming keeps Mary and Beth locked in his closet and forces Mary regularly to do video interviews.

On her birthday Ming rapes Mary and then video interviews her. He asks if she is having a good birthday. She tells him she can't when she has been raped. This upsets Ming who says he was making love to her but she wasn't making love to him. Mary says she can't do that while she is married to her husband. Ming asks her to make love to her like she does to her husband, calling out his name. This makes Mary ask if he had been listening to her family and if he has been in her house. Ming grows increasingly agitated and threatens to suffocate Mary's daughter with plastic wrap. Mary begs him not to and says she'll do what he asks. Ming puts the little girl back in the closet and Mary's muffled sounds are heard.

Back at the house, Mary's husband Irve is in the basement and realizes the window is open. There is dirt with shoe prints on the ground, and a small hole in the ceiling under the bedroom. He notifies the police who suggest someone with familiarity with electronics may have been listening to them. They suggest looking through Mary's old school yearbooks in case it was someone she knew through school.

Before Ming leaves the next day, he asks if he can pick up anything for Mary and her daughter. She asks for a Bible. He returns later with the Bible and says he is leaving the house again. After he's apparently left, Mary and Beth hear the door open and then hear noise in the kitchen. They pretend to be asleep and then hear music coming from the basement.

When Ming returns home later, Beth asks if Ming is keeping someone else in the basement. Ming explains that it's his cousin, Brian but there is an extra layer of padding on the floor in the closet so Brian can't hear Mary and Beth.

Ming says he has been invited to attend a conference in Chicago and he's rented an RV to take them with him. When Ming asks what Mary would do if someone asks about her in the RV, she admits she would say she is being held against her will. After some convincing by her daughter, Mary tells Ming to give her paper so she can make a list of needed supplies for the trip.

At 30 days, Mary's voice narrates saying that what kept her going was hope and her daughter's love. She would do anything to keep her daughter safe.

They begin the journey to Chicago in the RV. Mary and Beth are tied to the floor. Ming explains they are tied to the gas line. If they pull too hard, it will explode. He tells them he has installed listening devices and if they yell out to anyone, he will kill as many people as possible. Mary tried to whisper for help to some boys skateboarding but they don't take her plea seriously.

At day 45, they are back in Ming's home and he says his cousin is gone, so they can come out of the closet. Because they have been good, they can have the bedroom to themselves. On Father's Day. Ming lets Beth call Irv. She tells him she and mommy are OK, but she doesn't know when she's coming home. Irv asks to speak to the man holding them, but Ming tells Beth no.

During their regular video interviews Mary begs Ming to let her and Beth go. He says the Fourth of July holiday is coming up. He hears a noise and finds Beth outside the room looking for a bathroom. He becomes enraged and ties them to a door in the room.

For the Fourth of July on Day 49, Ming takes them to Como Park in the RV. Mary promises not to alert anyone. Meanwhile, Irv stays home with his and Mary's son Steven rather than watching the fireworks from Como Park, as they usually do.

On Day 53, Beth is now allowed to watch TV. Mary is losing faith, which causes her to try and see if she can pull the door hinges out that they are tied to. It works and the door falls down. Mary calls the police from the kitchen phone, then leads Beth outside where they hide behind the RV until the police arrive. At Ming's place of work, the police arrive and arrest him. When a female police officer asks if they were taken out of state, Mary states Chicago causing the female police officer to arrange for the FBI to be involved in this case. Mary and Irv are reunited at the police station.

Mary narrates again where it turns out that they are at the church days after the rescue. She says she doesn't want to forget. For  weeks it was a horrible time, but the Lord was with them. Mary was 36 when she was abducted, Beth was 8.

A post-script revealed that Ming Sen Shiue was sentenced to life in prison and was denied parole in 2016. When the authorities found Jason's body during the investigation, Ming stated that he had panicked. Elizabeth Stauffer now has children of her own.

Cast
 Alyson Hannigan as Mary Stauffer
 Howie Lai as Ming Sen Shiue
 Daphne Hoskins as Elizabeth Stauffer
 Daniel Nemes as Irv Stauffer
 Miles Phoenix Foley as Steven Stauffer
 Rhonda Rees as Deputy Knowles

Production

Reception

The movie had 1.04 million viewers during its first airing.

References

External links
 

Films about kidnapping
Lifetime (TV network) films
2019 television films